The Illinois Fighting Illini men's basketball team, representing the University of Illinois at Urbana–Champaign, has had 68 players drafted into the National Basketball Association (NBA) since the league began holding the yearly event in 1947. Each NBA franchise seeks to add new players through an annual draft. The NBA uses a draft lottery to determine the first three picks of the NBA draft; the 14 teams that did not make the playoffs the previous year are eligible to participate. After the first three picks are decided, the rest of the teams pick in reverse order of their win–loss record. To be eligible for the NBA Draft, a player in the United States must be at least 19 years old during the calendar year of the draft and must be at least one year removed from the graduation of his high school class.

The drafts held between 1947 and 1949 were held by the Basketball Association of America (BAA). The BAA became the National Basketball Association after absorbing teams from the National Basketball League in the fall of 1949. Official NBA publications include the BAA Drafts as part of the NBA's draft history. From 1967 until the ABA–NBA merger in 1976, the American Basketball Association (ABA) held its own draft.

Through the 2018 NBA draft, a Fighting Illini has been chosen first round of the draft 15 times in the history of the event with Meyers Leonard being the latest in 2012.

Key

Players selected in the BAA and NBA drafts

References

Illinois
Illinois Fighting Illini NBA draft